NGC 3073 is a dwarf lenticular galaxy in the constellation Ursa Major. It is at a distance of about 65 million light-years (20 megaparsecs) from Earth. NGC 3073 was discovered by astronomer William Herschel on April 1, 1790. The galaxy belongs to the NGC 3079 Group.

Gallery

References 

Ursa Major (constellation)
3073
5374
MCG objects
028974
Lenticular galaxies